Kanehara (written: 金原) is a Japanese surname. Notable people with the surname include:

, Japanese mixed martial artist
, Japanese writer
, Japanese mixed martial artist

Japanese-language surnames